Motive for Revenge is a 1935 American mystery film directed by Burt P. Lynwood, written by Stuart Anthony and starring Donald Cook, Irene Hervey and Doris Lloyd. After being released from prison, a former bank teller imprisoned for embezzlement is suspected of murdering his former wife's new husband.

Main cast
 Donald Cook as Barry Webster  
 Irene Hervey as Muriel Webster King  
 Doris Lloyd as Mrs. Fleming  
 Edwin Maxwell as  William King  
 Le Strange Millman as  District Attorney Milroy 
 Russell Simpson as  McAllister  
 John Kelly as  Detective Larkin  
 Edwin Argus as Detective Red  
 Billy West(silent film actor) as roy
 Wheeler Oakman as Doane  
 Frank LaRue as Warden  
 Fern Emmett as Mrs. Kenilworthy - Housekeeper  
 Dorothea Wolbert as Annie - Maid

References

External links
 
 
 
 
 

1935 films
1930s mystery drama films
American mystery drama films
Majestic Pictures films
American black-and-white films
American crime drama films
1935 crime drama films
Films directed by Burt P. Lynwood
1930s English-language films
1930s American films